Colonel William George Cubitt,  (19 October 1835 – 25 January 1903) was a senior officer in the British Indian Army and a recipient of the Victoria Cross, the highest award for gallantry in the face of the enemy that can be awarded to British and Commonwealth forces.

Military career
Cubitt was born in Calcutta, the son of an Indian Army officer. After an education in England, Cubitt entered the Indian Army as an ensign in the 13th Bengal Native Infantry, Bengal Army, on 26 July 1853.

Cubitt was 21 years old, and a lieutenant in the 13th Bengal Native Infantry when, during the Indian Mutiny, the following deed took place at the siege of Lucknow, for which he was awarded the VC.

After the Indian Mutiny, Cubitt continued to serve with the Indian Army and, in 1880, was with the Khyber line force during the Second Anglo-Afghan War. Promoted colonel in July 1883, he served with the Akha Expedition in 1883–84, and in the Third Anglo-Burmese War in 1886–87, during which he was awarded the Distinguished Service Order (DSO). At the time of his retirement in 1892 he was in command of the 43rd Gurkhas (later the 8th Gurkha Rifles).

His medals, including the VC, are on display in the Lord Ashcroft Gallery at the Imperial War Museum, London.

Personal life
In 1863 Cubitt married Charlotte Isabella Hills, sister of Lieutenant-General Sir James Hills-Johnes VC. They had three sons and two daughters.

On retirement, Cubitt lived in Camberley, Surrey. He died on 25 January 1903, aged 67, and was buried in St. Peter's Churchyard, Frimley, Surrey.

References

British recipients of the Victoria Cross
Indian Rebellion of 1857 recipients of the Victoria Cross
Companions of the Distinguished Service Order
British Indian Army officers
British East India Company Army officers
1835 births
1903 deaths
People educated at King's College School, London
Military personnel from Kolkata
British military personnel of the Second Anglo-Afghan War
British military personnel of the Third Anglo-Burmese War